Éder Fermino Lima (born 29 June 1984), commonly known as Éder Lima, is a futsal player who plays as a pivot. Born in Brazil, he represents the Russia national team.

Awards
2012 FIFA Futsal World Cup: 
Golden Shoe winner (9 goals)
UEFA Futsal Euro 2014: 
Golden Shoe winner (8 goals)
2016 FIFA Futsal World Cup: 
Silver Shoe winner
Silver Ball winner
UEFA Futsal Euro 2018:
Third Place

References

External links

Gazprom UGRA profile

1984 births
Living people
Sportspeople from São Paulo
Brazilian men's futsal players
Futsal forwards
Brazilian emigrants to Russia
Naturalised citizens of Russia
Russian men's futsal players
Russian people of Brazilian descent